Clint Amos (born 2 September 1983) is an Australian former professional rugby league footballer.

Background
Amos was born in Ballina, New South Wales, Australia.

Playing career
Amos played junior football for the Burleigh Bears and moved to the North Queensland Cowboys, where he made his first-grade debut in 2006. He then signed for the Gold Coast Titans for its inaugural season in 2007, where he was a regular member of the first-grade team. However, he fell out of the squad in 2008 as Nathan Friend became the side's preferred hooker. He returned to the Cowboys for the 2009 NRL season, signing a two-year deal. 

He played for the Northern Pride in the 2011 Queensland Cup.

Post playing
At the end of the 2011 season he retired from playing to become the Cowboys' business development manager.

In 2017, Amos and his wife Hannah were contestants on the thirteenth season of Australian reality series The Block.

Career highlights
 First grade debut: North Queensland v Manly-Warringah Sea Eagles, 18 March 2006 (Round 2) at Dairy Farmers Stadium

References

1983 births
Living people
Australian rugby league players
Burleigh Bears players
Gold Coast Titans players
North Queensland Cowboys players
Northern Pride RLFC players
Rugby league hookers
Rugby league locks
Rugby league players from Ballina, New South Wales